This is a List of Southern Miss Golden Eagles football players in the NFL Draft.

Key

Selections

References

Southern Miss

Southern Miss Golden Eagles NFL Draft